The 2017 Alamo Bowl (December) was a college football bowl game played on December 28, 2017, at the Alamodome in San Antonio, Texas.  The 25th annual Alamo Bowl featured the Stanford Cardinal of the Pac-12 against the TCU Horned Frogs of the Big 12. It was one of the 2017–18 bowl games concluding the 2017 FBS football season. Sponsored by Valero Energy, the game was officially known as the Valero Alamo Bowl. The contest was televised on ESPN, with kickoff at 8:00 PM (CST).

Team selection
The game featured the Stanford Cardinal against the TCU Horned Frogs. This was the third meeting between the schools – they played games in 2007 and 2008 at each team's home stadium; TCU won both games to lead the series 2–0.

Stanford

TCU

Game summary

Scoring summary

Statistics

References

2017–18 NCAA football bowl games
2017
2017
2017
2017 in sports in Texas
December 2017 sports events in the United States